Hookers Bend is an unincorporated community in Hardin County, Tennessee. Hookers Bend is located north of Savannah near a bend in the Tennessee River. The community is named after founder John Hooker.

References

Unincorporated communities in Hardin County, Tennessee
Unincorporated communities in Tennessee